Imágenes (Images), is the title of the second studio album released by Puerto-Rican singer Lourdes Robles in 1990. The album became very successful in the United States where it peaked at number nine in the Billboard Latin Pop Albums chart. The album includes the number-one single "Abrázame Fuerte", and the top ten hit "Gracias a Tu Amor", a duet with Nicaraguan performer Luis Enrique. "Miedo", "Que Lástima" and "Es Él" were released as singles, reaching the Top 40 in the US.

Imágenes was produced by Rudy Perez and Ricardo Eddy and features songs written by both producers, Omar Sánchez, Jorge Luis Piloto and Manuel Alejandro. The album was awarded with a Gold album certification.

Track listing
The information is taken from the album liner notes.

Chart performance

References

1990 albums
Lourdes Robles albums
Spanish-language albums
Albums produced by Rudy Pérez